Gianmarco Calleri (10 January 1942 – 8 March 2023) was an Italian footballer, entrepreneur and sports functionary.

Calleri was born in Busalla on 10 January 1942. A professional football player, he was a pupil of the Piedmontese team  G.S. Bacigalupo.  He played for the Novara Calcio  and S.S. Monza 1912. The whole season was considered a player S.S. Lazio, but never made his debut in the first team.

Calleri was President of U.S. Alessandria Calcio 1912 (1983—1985), S.S. Lazio (1986—1992), Torino F.C. (1994—1997), AC Bellinzona (1998—2001).

Calleri died on 8 March 2023, at the age of 81.

References

External links
 Serie A, Calleri:  "Il Toro non rischia. Tevez e Pogba i migliori. Balotelli? E' scarso

1942 births
2023 deaths
Italian footballers
Novara F.C. players
A.C. Monza players
S.S. Lazio players
Torino F.C. presidents
Italian football chairmen and investors
Association footballers not categorized by position
Sportspeople from the Province of Genoa